Fima or FIMA may refer to:
 Fima (artist) (1914–2005), Israeli artist
 Federation of Islamic Medical Associations
 Fellow of the Institute of Mathematics and its Applications

See also 
 FEMA (disambiguation)